Kjell Arvid Svendsen (born 27 August 1953 in Haugesund) is a Norwegian schoolteacher and politician for the Christian Democratic Party.

Biography
He was a son of manager Karl Sigfred Svendsen and housewife Anny Kristine Levinsen. He grew up in Skudeneshavn, and after primary and lower secondary school here he attended Hetland Upper Secondary School. Finishing in 1972, he was a teacher at Ådland before returning to his own lower secondary school, Skudenes, where he was a teacher from 1973 to 1995. He took higher education at Stord Teachers' College (1975–1978) and Stavanger Teachers' College (1978–1979).

He entered politics as a deputy member of Karmøy municipal council and member of the cultural board from 1983 to 1987. He was then elected to Karmøy municipal council's executive committee, being steadily re-elected. He served as mayor from 1995 to 2011. He also served as a deputy representative to the Parliament of Norway from Rogaland during the terms 2005–2009 and 2009–2013; meeting regularly in October 2005 while Dagfinn Høybråten was still a member of the outgoing Bondevik's Second Cabinet.

Svendsen chaired Karmøy Christian Democratic Party from 1987 to 1988. He chaired Rogaland Christian Democratic Party from 2004 to 2007, during which time he was also a member of the party's national board. He has been active in the Norwegian Lutheran Inner Mission Society and a board member of the companies Gassnor (1996–2004), Haugaland Bompengeselskap (chairman, since 2001), KLP Skadeforsikring (since 2005) and Fonna Health Trust (since 2006).

References

1953 births
Living people
People from Haugesund
People from Karmøy
Stord/Haugesund University College alumni
Norwegian schoolteachers
Members of the Storting
Mayors of places in Rogaland
Christian Democratic Party (Norway) politicians
Norwegian Lutherans